The Eastern Sectional Figure Skating Championships is an annual figure skating competition sanctioned by U.S. Figure Skating which has been held since 1938.

Skaters compete in five levels: Senior, Junior, Novice, Intermediate, and Juvenile.  Medals are awarded in four disciplines: Ladies singles, Men's singles, Pairs, and Ice dance.  Medals are given out in four colors: gold (first), silver (second), bronze (third), and pewter (fourth).  Skaters who place in the top four at the Eastern Sectional advance to the U.S. Figure Skating Championships.

Notable skaters who have competed at Easterns over the years include Olympic gold medalists Dick Button, Tenley Albright, Carol Heiss, Dorothy Hamill, Scott Hamilton and Nancy Kerrigan.

Senior medalists

Men

Women

Pairs

Ice dancing

References

 History of the Eastern Sectional Championships

External links
 2008 Eastern Sectional Championships
 2011 Eastern Sectional Championships
 2012 Eastern Sectional Championships
 2018 Eastern Sectional Championships

Figure skating competitions
Eastern Sectional
Sports in the Eastern United States